Khánh Hòa is a province of Vietnam located in the South Central Coast. It has a population of 1,147,000 and spans an area of 5,197 km². Its capital is Nha Trang. Khánh Hòa is the site of Bảo Đại's summer home, the Pasteur Institute of Nha Trang, the Institute of Oceanography, the Institute of Vaccines and Biological Substances, and was headquarters of the US Army's Special Forces ("the Green Berets") during the Vietnam War in the late 1950s and 1960s. Cam Ranh Bay port is on land closest to a deep sea drop in Vietnam - the best site for submarine bases in Vietnam. An ancient temple of Champa is on the north side of Nha Trang.

History
The site of what is now Khánh Hòa had been within the territory of the Champa Kingdom before it was annexed to Đại Việt's (Vietnam's) territory. In 1653, one of the Nguyễn lords, Nguyễn Phúc Tần, sent his troops to occupy Phan Rang. The Champa king Bà Tấm surrendered to Nguyễn's troops and ceded an area from the east of the Phan Rang River to Phú Yên to the Nguyễn lord. The Nguyễn lord accepted the ceded territory and set up the Thái Khang garrison and divided it into two districts: Thái Khang and Diên Ninh.

In 1832, under the rule of Emperor Minh Mạng, this area was renamed Khánh Hòa and was divided into two districts, Phủ Diên Khánh and Phủ Ninh Hòa, which between them had a total of four counties: Phước Điền and Vĩnh Xương counties; and Quảng Phước and Tân Định counties, respectively.

Under French Indochina, the provincial capital was located in Diên Khánh Citadel, but it was relocated to Nha Trang in 1945.

During the Vietnam War, Khánh Hòa was a hub of military activity for the Republic of Vietnam army (ARVN), the Republic of Vietnam Navy, the Republic of Vietnam Air Force, and for the U.S. Pacific Air Forces (USAF), particularly in Cam Ranh Bay and at the Nha Trang Air Base. The II Corp. headquarters were located in Nha Trang and populated by general and field officers, intelligence groups and ARVN liaisons.

After the communists' victory and the Fall of Saigon on April 30, 1975, the communist regime merged two provinces, Phú Yên and Khánh Hòa, into Phú Khánh province on 29 October 1975. In 1977, Nha Trang was upgraded to city status. In 1982, the National Assembly decided to incorporate the Spratly Islands into Phú Khánh province. On June 30, 1989, the National Assembly reversed its previous decision and split Phú Khánh province into two provinces as they were before.

Geography and climate

Its geographical coordinates are 108°40’33" to 109°27’55" E and 11°42’50" to 12°52’15" N.

The province also administers large territorial waters. The Spratly Islands are part of the province's Trường Sa District. Cam Ranh Bay is strategically important and has been used as a naval base by several major powers throughout history.

Hòn Đôi Cliff (Mũi Hòn Đôi) on the Hòn Gốm Peninsula in Vạn Ninh District is the easternmost tip of Vietnam's mainland.

The province is mostly mountainous. The highest peak is Vọng Phu Mountain at the border of Đắk Lắk province. The only large lowland area is located around Ninh Hòa in the north of the province. Partly as a result of this, not much land is available for agriculture.  or 16.7% of Khánh Hòa's total area are used for farming, one of the lowest shares in the South Central Coast. Forests cover more than half of the province's area.

There are two distinct seasons: the rainy season lasts from April to December, with the other months being the dry season, except in Nha Trang where the rainy season lasts for just two months. The average relative humidity is 80.5%.

Demographics
, the province had a population of 1.147 million, of which the majority are Kinh or Vietnamese people, the dominant ethnic group in Vietnam. Minority groups dwelling in the province are the Cham, Raglai people, the "Overseas Chinese" Hoa people, and the Austroasiatic-speaking Koho people.

Khánh Hòa had an urban population of 466,500 people or 40.7% of the total in 2007, making it the most urbanized province of the South Central Coast. The average population growth per year between 2000 and 2007 was 1.26%, close to the average of the region. Growth was particularly strong in urban areas (2.24%).

Administrative divisions
Khánh Hòa is subdivided into nine district-level sub-divisions:

 6 districts:

 Cam Lâm
 Diên Khánh
 Khánh Sơn
 Khánh Vĩnh
 Trường Sa (also known as the Spratly Islands)
 Vạn Ninh

 1 district-level town:
 Ninh Hòa (recently upgraded from district status)
 2 provincial cities:

 Cam Ranh
 Nha Trang (capital)

They are further subdivided into six commune-level towns (or townlets), 99 communes, and 35 wards.

Economy
With a GDP per capita of 16.1 million VND (2007), Khánh Hòa is economically the most developed province of central Vietnam (after Da Nang). It has a relatively small agricultural sector, but strong industry and services. The province is endowed with beautiful natural landscapes and beaches, which (together with its Cham heritage) attracts a large number of tourists. Khánh Hòa has had a significant trade surplus in recent years, with exports in 2007 of US$503.3 million and imports of US$222.5 million.

Agriculture, forestry, fishing
Given its lack of flat land, Khánh Hòa has a relatively small agricultural sector. Rice harvests are among the lowest in the South Central Coast with 188,500t in 2007. However, its output of sugar cane (738,200t in 2007, 4.25% of the national figure) and cashew nuts (5,238t, 1.74%) are more significant.

Khánh Hòa is one of the few provinces with a higher gross output in fishing than in agriculture. This is mostly due to the large number of aquaculture farms in the province, which make up around two thirds of the fishing output.

Industry
Nha Trang is the South Central Coast's second largest industrial center and the province in general accounts for more than one fifth of the region's industrial GDP. Food processing industries are large, especially those processing local fishing products and food for shrimp farms. Other industrial sectors produce beverages, fabric, textiles, paper, and construction materials.

Industrial production is not only in and around Nha Trang. The province has also benefited significantly from investment related to the former Russian naval base at Cam Ranh, to which around 30 factories were attached. A major new industrial center is being developed in the north of the province around Vân Phong Port (Vân Phong Economic Zone).

Infrastructure
Khánh Hòa is located along Vietnam's main north-south transport corridors. National Road 1 and the North–South Railway run through the province. All Reunification Express trains as well as some local trains stop at Nha Trang Railway Station.

As a coastal province featuring several natural deep water bays, Khánh Hòa has what is needed to develop its deep-water seaports. Nha Trang Port (a tourist and cargo port) and Dốc Lết Port (a shipbuilding and logistics port) are now in use. Vân Phong Port, a megaproject intended to be developed in Vân Phong Bay by a consortium of Japanese corporations (with Sumitomo as the leading investor) with an estimated investment of US$15 billion, is in progress. On completion, this deep sea port will be capable of handling ships up to 100,000 tonnes and 100 million tonnes of loaded/unloaded cargo per annum.

Cam Ranh International Airport is located in the south of the province and is one of Vietnam's busiest airports.

Education
Khánh Hòa is one of the most important educational centers in Vietnam. It is home to Nha Trang University (formerly Nha Trang Fishery University), a multidisciplinary university; the Naval Academy; the Air Force Officer Academy; a Normal College; a Kindergarten Teacher's Training College; and an Arts and Tourism College.

References

External links

Official website of the provincial government

 
Provinces of Vietnam